Nicholas Grant Dean (born July 12, 1996), better known by his stage name Nick Dean, is an alternative-pop singer-songwriter/producer, photographer and filmmaker based in Los Angeles, California.

Early life

At the age of 5, Nick Dean's parents moved the family to the small, rural farming village of Vernègues, France where Nick spent his childhood. During their years abroad, Nick traveled extensively across North Africa, Central America and Asia, where his mother laid the foundation for a humanitarian organization she would later create. At the age of 11,
Nick Dean and his family relocated to Rochester, New York. While being homeschooled on the road, Nick joined his family on a four-month humanitarian journey through Southeast Asia where he taught himself to ride a motorcycle, strapped his guitar to his back, and played for audiences in orphanages, hill tribes, rural schools and bars in northern Thailand, Cambodia, Laos, and Vietnam.

Musical career

When Nick Dean was 8 years old, he became a lead soloist with a renowned, internationally touring boys choir in France, traveling around Europe and Guadeloupe/Martinique. At the age of fourteen, Nick Dean auditioned for and won a spot on the first season of the US Television show The X Factor. Although he additioned solo Nick was placed by Simon Cowell into a group of 10 members called Intensity (stylized as InTENsity). The group advanced to the live shows where they were voted off at the expense of The Stereo Hogzz in Week 2 by a majority vote from the judges. However, InTENsity received more votes than The Stereo Hogzz which meant that if the result went to deadlock, The Stereo Hogzz would have been eliminated. In 2013 Nick Dean moved to Los Angeles, California to continue pursuing his music career. In Los Angeles Nick Dean re-connected with his friend from Rochester, Mike Miller. The two created Nomad Music Group and began writing and co-producing a new sound and style, releasing Nick Dean's debut single "How Did We?" in August 2017.

Production
Nick Dean created a production company called Nomad Art Productions in 2017 and began working with artists and brands. Dean shot the lyric video for Ryan Riback's single "One Last Time" featuring some chick which was released on July 19, 2017. Nick Dean was also commissioned to film and star in the music video for Burak Yeter and Ryan Riback's collaboration "Go 2.0". He has also worked with brands such as Audi, Away Travel, and SubPac.

Discography

Singles

References 

People from Orlando, Florida
1996 births
Living people
American male pop singers
21st-century American singers
The X Factor (American TV series) contestants
American child singers
Singers from Florida
21st-century American male singers